The Reserve Infantry Division of Anhui Provincial Military District() is a reserve infantry formation of the People's Liberation Army.

The Reserve Infantry Division of Chu County() was activated on November 17, 1983, at Chu County, Anhui. The division was composed of 3 infantry regiments and 1 artillery regiment.

In 1999 the division was reorganized as the Reserve Infantry Division of Anhui. In September 1999, the Anti-Aircraft Artillery Regiment, Reserve Infantry Division of Anhui was activated from the inactivating 102nd Infantry Regiment, 34th Infantry Division.

The division was now composed of:
1st Infantry Regiment - Fuyang, Anhui
2nd Infantry Regiment - Anqing, Anhui
3rd Infantry Regiment - Chaohu, Anhui
Artillery Regiment - Chuzhou, Anhui
Anti-Aircraft Artillery Regiment

References

Reserve divisions of the People's Liberation Army
Military units and formations established in 1984